Spanish Grease is an album by jazz percussionist Willie Bobo recorded in 1965 and released on the Verve label.

Reception

The Allmusic review by Richie Unterberger awarded the album 4 stars stating "The timbales player and his band lay down respectable grooves, but "Spanish Grease" is the only original on the album, and by far the most rewarding number".

Track listing
 "Spanish Grease"  (Willie Bobo, Melvin Lastie) – 2:47
 "Hurt So Bad" (Bobby Hart, Teddy Randazzo, Bobby Weinstein) – 2:39
 "It's Not Unusual" [vocal version] (Gordon Mills, Les Reed) – 2:20 MOG   
 "Our Day Will Come" (Mort Garson, Bob Hilliard) – 2:50
 "Haitian Lady" (Harold Ousley) – 4:05
 "Blues in the Closet"  (Oscar Pettiford) – 2:11
 "Nessa" (Ed Diehl) – 4:07
 "Elation" (Ousley) – 3:49
 "It's Not Unusual" [instrumental version] (Mills, Reed) – 2:29
 "Shot Gun/Blind Man, Blind Man" (Junior Walker/Herbie Hancock) – 5:11
Recorded at Van Gelder Studio in Englewood Cliffs, NJ on June 8 (tracks 1 & 4), August 30 (tracks 5–8) and September 8 (tracks 2, 3, 9 & 10)

Personnel
Willie Bobo – vocals, percussion, timbales
Melvin Lastie – cornet
Bobby Brown – alto saxophone, tenor saxophone
Clarence Henry – guitar
Richard Davis, Jim Phillips – bass
Victor Pantoja – congas

References

Verve Records albums
Willie Bobo albums
1965 albums
Albums produced by Creed Taylor
Albums recorded at Van Gelder Studio